Alexis Noble (born 5 May 1963 in Montevideo, Uruguay) is a former football forward. Noble played for most of his career in Universidad Católica. He was part of the 1984 Universidad Católica team that won the Primera División de Chile.

Titles

References

External links
https://web.archive.org/web/20121003035712/http://www.footballzz.com/player/alexis_noble/current/profile/0/default/128404

1963 births
Living people
Uruguayan footballers
Uruguayan expatriate footballers
Uruguay under-20 international footballers
Uruguay international footballers
Club Nacional de Football players
Peñarol players
Rampla Juniors players
San Lorenzo de Almagro footballers
Centro Atlético Fénix players
Independiente Medellín footballers
Club Deportivo Universidad Católica footballers
Chilean Primera División players
Argentine Primera División players
Expatriate footballers in Chile
Expatriate footballers in Argentina
Expatriate footballers in Colombia
Association football forwards